Homesongs is the debut album by British singer-songwriter Adem Ilhan, who was previously best known for his work in the band Fridge with Kieran Hebden. It contains the singles "Ringing in My Ear" and "These Are Your Friends". The album's title alludes to the fact that the album was recorded entirely at Ilhan's own house. The album's title also comes from the themes of "home" in all the songs.

Track listing

References

2004 debut albums
Adem Ilhan albums
Domino Recording Company albums